Tilburg Universiteit (English: Tilburg University) is a railway station located in Tilburg, Netherlands. It is situated on the Breda–Eindhoven railway. Opened as Tilburg West in 1969, it was renamed after the nearby Tilburg University in 2010. The train services are operated by Nederlandse Spoorwegen.

Train service
The following services currently call at Tilburg Universiteit:
2x per hour local services (sprinter) Tilburg Universiteit - Eindhoven
2x per hour local services (sprinter) Arnhem Centraal - 's-Hertogenbosch - Tilburg - Breda

Bus service

The station is served by the following city bus line, operated by Arriva:

External links
NS website 
Dutch Public Transport journey planner 

Universiteit
Railway stations opened in 1969